Ayvacık may refer to the following places in Turkey:

 Ayvacık, Çameli
 Ayvacık, Çanakkale
 Ayvacık, Dursunbey
 Ayvacık, Samsun